Karodpathi is a 2014 Indian Kannada-language film directed by Ramesh PCR, starring Komal Kumar, Meera Nandan and Jasmin Bhasin in lead roles.

Cast

Komal Kumar as Banti Babu
Meera Nandan as Vidya 
Jasmin Bhasin
Dingri Nagaraj 
Guru Prasad as Kotilinga 
Jayasri Krishna
Malavika Menon
Muni

Music
Music by Abhiman Roy. Komal sang a song in the film.

Reception

Critical response 

Shyam Prasad S of Bangalore Mirror scored the film at 3 out of 5 stars and says "Karodpathi was delayed to change the plot but not much seems to have been changed. Another Kannada film, Dasavala also had a similar plot. All these films can be traced back to the 1996 Brazilian film Segredos em Família in which a lonely rich man hires actors to act as his family members on his birthday".The Times of India scored the film at 3 out of 5 stars and wrote "Komal has done a wonderful job, especially in the sentimental sequences. Guruprasad shines in dialogue delivery. Meera Nandan is okay. Abhiman Roy’s music is a highlight. Selva’s cinematography is good". Sify wrote "Music by Abhiman Roy which has gone viral is the only gluing part of the movie. Director C Ramesh needs to do his homework before he gets his hand on other project for the betterment Kannada films".

References

2010s Kannada-language films
2014 films